The Reich Family is mainly known for their involvement with deaf education during the time of The Holocaust.

Markus Reich 

Markus Reich was born in 1844 in Kaolin, Bohemia. In 1865, when he was 21 years old, he went to Germany to learn everything that he could to become qualified to become a teacher for the deaf at the Jewish Teachers Training College and from 1870-1871 worked and studied at the Royal Institution for the Deaf in Berlin. Reich also worked as a private tutor which he used his money to purchase books about the deaf and deafness. His inspiration and drive came from an acquaintance he had with a deaf man who “was educated, well brought up, and could speak.” Reich saw how having a good education positively affected his acquaintance life that he was determined to “make complete, worthy, happy people of the deaf.”

While attending the Royal Institution of the Deaf he noticed that Jewish children were denied admission into the school. That drove him to establish a Jewish institution for deaf children along with his inspiration that came from two religious sources. The first was from the Chief Rabbi of London S. Adler’s 1864 tract The Morning and the Evening Sacrifice which said, “special admonition to support the deaf within the Jewish community” that he based on Isaiah 29.18: “Is it not a duty that falls to all of us to take up these children and to protect them on behalf of God, to educate them so that, as the prophet tells us, everyday the deaf may hear the word of the book.” The second inspiration came from a passage from the Talmud: “Only the ignorant are truly poor.”  So in 1873 he made his plan a reality and founded the Israelite Institution for the Deaf of Germany in a small house in Fürstenwalde an der Spree.

During a financial crisis in 1884, Markus Reich formed a support group for his institution called “Friends of the Deaf” (Jedide Ilmin), which included rich Jewish members of the community who came together to provide funding. With all the help, Reich relocated his school to Weissensee in Berlin in 1890.(pg 132) With the school expanding in both students and teachers he decided to remodel the institution in 1911, but sadly he wasn’t able to see it completed later that year. He died on May 23, 1911.

Reich was one of the great men in Germany that devoted his life to help the deaf. After his death, a teacher from the school wrote, “Reich had wholeheartedly entered the world and the being of the deaf. Thus he also used the language of the deaf, sign language, as few hearing persons have done…. Reich fully mastered sign language and he never let himself be prevented from making use of it whenever it was appropriate, including in teaching…. To us teachers, Markus Reich was a true friend and trustworthy counselor.” (pg133)

In 1879 he married a woman named Emma, who along with her sister Anna helped educating the deaf children, and with her they had a son they named Felix Reich. In 1919 Felix takes over directorship of his father’s school of the deaf and while in control he authored numerous publications for the Union of German Teachers of the Deaf (pg133). Then 1926 Association of Former Students of the Institution established a publication called The Link.

Felix Reich 

As the son of Emma and Markus Reich Felix took over the institution in 1919. Felix overcame Germany's postwar inflation and kept the school afloat. In 1931 to 1931 he reached 59 students.

In either 1938 or 1939 Nazi soldiers arrested Felix in front of the whole school assembly.  He was then imprisoned in Sachsenhausen, but was then inexplicably released and returned to the school.  He then managed to arrange safe passage for himself and 10 of his school children on the kindertransport to England.  With them was an 11 year old girl who was not a pupil at the school and who was not Jewish: she was the Aryan daughter of one of the teachers at the school.  

The 10 Jewish children were sent to the Residential Jewish School for the Deaf in Nightingale Road, Balham, London.

Felix Reich was subsequently interned on the Isle of Man.  

After the war he remained in England but did not maintain contact with any of the children he saved.

He died in Manchester in 1964.

Israelite Institution for the Deaf of Germany 

Israelite Institution for the Deaf of Germany other wise known as israelitische Taubstummenanstalt für Deutschlan was founded in 1873. The school was built in a small house in Fürstenwalde an der Spree. Markus had been inspired to create this school with the mission to “preserve and plant in the hearts of the Jewish deaf the religion of their forefathers.” -Markus Reich (pg132) At the beginning of the schools development both Reich and the school were very poor. The school started out with just 12 children enrolled. Thankfully with the support of the organization “Friends of the Deaf” or “Jedide Ilmin”, rich members of the community were able to untie their wealth to provide funding to Reich and the school. With the found financial security Reich was able to relocate his school to Weissensee near Berlin in 1890 (132) during this time Reich was now able to “devote himself entirely to the mission of raising and educating his deaf children.”(pg 132)

In 1911 The school was able to expand. Their staff grew with the addition of 4 male and 2.  Female teachers. They had 45 students enrolled. During this rebuild period Markus passed away. The school was then transferred to Markus's wife Emma Reich. Then in 1919 Felix reach took over the directorship of the institution.

References

External links 

Das Band : Zeitschrift der jüdischen Gehörlosen (B24), Felix Reich's 1926-1937 newsletter for the Israelite Institution for the Deaf of Germany, at the Leo Baeck Institute, New York

Educators of the deaf
German families
Deafness in Germany